Shimon Even (June 15, 1935 – May 1, 2004) was an Israeli computer science researcher. His main topics of interest included algorithms, graph theory and cryptography. He was a member of the Computer Science Department at the Technion since 1974.  Shimon Even was the PhD advisor of Oded Goldreich, a prominent cryptographer.

Books
 Algorithmic Combinatorics, Macmillan, 1973.
 Graph Algorithms, Computer Science Press, 1979. .

See also 
 Oblivious transfer

External links
 Memorial page
 Bibliography on DBLP
 Prof. Even's "genealogy" (PDF)

1935 births
2004 deaths
Modern cryptographers
Graph theorists
Israeli computer scientists
Israeli cryptographers
Harvard University alumni
Even Shimon
Burials at Yarkon Cemetery